Gotlib Mikhailovich Roninson (12 February 1916 —  25 December 1991) was a Soviet actor. He appeared in more than thirty films from 1953 to 1991.

Filmography

References

External links 

1916 births
1991 deaths
Soviet male film actors
Jewish Russian actors
Soviet male stage actors
Soviet male television actors
Honored Artists of the RSFSR
People's Artists of the RSFSR
Burials at Vvedenskoye Cemetery
Male actors from Vilnius